Alvi Kola or Alavi Kola Olvi Kola may refer to:
 Alavi Kola, Mahmudabad
 Alvi Kola, Nowshahr
 Alavi Kola, Sari